Hits 54 is a compilation album released in the UK in November 2002. It contains 40 tracks on two CDs, including three number one singles on the UK Singles Chart from Will Young & Gareth Gates, Las Ketchup, and Blazin' Squad.

"The Long and Winding Road"'s music video is featured on disc two as a special enhanced feature able to be watched when put into a PC. The song itself opens disc one.

Milky's "Just the Way You Are" was previously featured on Hits 53.

Track listing
Disc one

Disc two

External links
 Track Listing At Amazon

2002 compilation albums
Hits (compilation series) albums